Kerry Margaret Abello (born September 17, 1999) is an American professional soccer player who plays as a defender for Orlando Pride of the National Women's Soccer League.

A versatile player, Abello played center-back, full-back and forward during her collegiate career with the Penn State Nittany Lions before being drafted 24th overall in the 2021 NWSL Draft.

Early life 
Born in Elmhurst, Illinois, Abello grew up playing club soccer for Team Chicago and Eclipse Select SC, and also played one year of high school soccer at Benet Academy. She was a three-time NSCAA Youth All-American between 2014 and 2016. Within the 2017 recruiting class, Abello ranked 12th overall and as the no. 2 defender nationally by TopDrawerSoccer.com.

Penn State Nittany Lions 
Abello played five seasons of college soccer at Pennsylvania State University between 2017 and 2021 while also studying as a pre-medical major in biological life sciences and Spanish. A high achiever academically, she enrolled in the Schreyer Honors College and was a four-time CoSIDA Academic All-American including CoSIDA Academic All-American of the Year for the 2020–21 and 2021 seasons, the first student-athlete to earn the distinction twice in soccer for Division I. As a freshman, Abello made 15 appearances for the Nittany Lions all as a substitute and recorded a season-high 45 minutes on August 20 in a game against Hofstra Pride. The team won the 2017 Big Ten Women's Soccer Tournament. Predominantly playing as a forward, Abello became a starter in 2018, starting 19 of 23 appearances, and tallied seven goals and five assists as Penn State clinched the Big Ten regular season title. As a junior in 2019, Abello transitioned to playing left-back and started all 24 of Penn State's games, scoring eight goals and three assists on the way to earning First Team All-Big Ten honors. Ahead of the 2020 season, Abello was named as team captain. Having been selected in the 2021 NWSL Draft, she elected to delay her pro career and return in 2021 to contest both the delayed 2020 season and the 2021 season following the NCAA's offer of an additional year of eligibility in light of the COVID-19 pandemic. For the 2020–21 campaign, Abello moved to playing at center-back, making 12 appearances before missing the final four matches due to injury as Penn State won the Big Ten regular season title for the second time in three seasons. In her fifth and final season, Abello started all 20 games for the Nittany Lions and earned First Team All-Big Ten honors for the second time.

In the 2018 offseason, Abello played a season at center-back with the Chicago Red Stars Reserves in the WPSL. The team topped the Northern Conference and progressed to the playoff semi-finals before losing to Pensacola FC.

Club career

Orlando Pride 
On January 13, 2021, Abello was selected in the third round (24th overall) of the 2021 NWSL Draft by Orlando Pride. Having returned to Penn State to exhaust her fifth year of college eligibility during the 2021 season, Abello signed a two-year contract with the team on January 28, 2022, ahead of the 2022 season. She made her professional debut on April 3, 2022, as a 61st-minute substitute against Washington Spirit during the 2022 NWSL Challenge Cup.

International career 
Abello has been rostered for the United States national teams at under-14, under-15, under-17, under-18 and under-19 levels. In October 2016 she was called-up for the under-18 team to play at the 2016 Women's International Cup in Ireland. She attended three training camps with the under-19s in February, May and June of 2017. In July 2017, Abello traveled to Australia to play three matches with the under-18s.

Career statistics

College summary

Club summary 
.

Honors

College
Big Ten Conference regular season: 2018, 2020
Big Ten Tournament: 2017, 2019

Individual
CoSIDA Academic All-American of the Year: 2020, 2021
Big Ten Medal of Honor: 2021

References

External links 
 Penn State profile
 

1999 births
Living people
People from Elmhurst, Illinois
People from Batavia, Illinois
Soccer players from Illinois
American women's soccer players
Women's association football defenders
Women's association football forwards
Penn State Nittany Lions women's soccer players
Orlando Pride draft picks
Orlando Pride players
Women's Premier Soccer League players
National Women's Soccer League players